The Philippine House Committee on Government Enterprises and Privatization, or House Government Enterprises and Privatization Committee is a standing committee of the Philippine House of Representatives.

Jurisdiction 
As prescribed by House Rules, the committee's jurisdiction is on the creation, organization, operation, reorganization and amendments of the charters of government-owned or controlled corporations which includes the following:
 Government Service Insurance System
 Social Security System
 Similar institutions

However, this does not include government-owned or controlled banks and financial institutions.

Members, 18th Congress

Historical members

18th Congress

Members for the Majority 
 Marissa Andaya (Camarines Sur–1st, NPC)

See also 
 House of Representatives of the Philippines
 List of Philippine House of Representatives committees

Notes

References

External links 
House of Representatives of the Philippines

Government Enterprises and Privatization